Tanjung Api Airport , is an airport near Ampana, the capital city of the Tojo Una-Una Regency, in the province of Central Sulawesi on the island of Sulawesi in Indonesia. It serves the town of Ampana as well as the surrounding region.

History

2006-2013 
The construction of Tanjung Api Airport was planned when former Regent of Tojo Una-Una Regency, Damsik Ladjalani, promised to build an airport in the area of Tojo Una-Una Regency. This would allow easier and more convenient access to the Tojo Una-Una Regency. The distance from Ampana to the capital city of Central Sulawesi, Palu, is considered far away because someone has to travel overland about ten hours to reach Ampana from Palu.

Fund allocation for the construction of the airport began in 2006 with a value of Rp. 84 billion through the Tojo Una-Una Regency Regional Budget in the period of 2006–2014. The physical construction of the airport began in 2010, with the main focus being the runway.

In 2007, then-Minister of Transportation Jusman Syafii Djamal issued a Minister of Transportation Regulation which decided to change the location of prospective Tanjung Api airports. The original location was Labuan Village, Ampana City Subdistrict, but this was canceled because of problems with land acquisition problems. Finally, after going through a review, the location of the new airport was determined, namely in Pusungi Village, Ampana Tete District.

2014-present 
In 2014, Transportation Minister Ignasius Jonan inaugurated 20 ports and 10 airports to further open inter-island connectivity spread throughout Indonesia. One of these was Tanjung Api Airport. Jonan said that the ten airports would serve pioneer flights with the capacity to be landed by ATR 72 and Cessna 208 Caravan aircraft. He added that the entire source of funding came from the government and regional budget.

The passenger terminal, which is designed like Maleo, a bird that is commonly found in Tojo Una-Una, has an area of 1,000 m2 and was built in 2014. Construction of the third stage of widening and extension of the runway was scheduled to begin by early 2015.

The runway, which currently has a length of 1,850 meters, will be extended by 200 meters so that it can accommodate larger aircraft. In addition, the width of the runway will be increased by 15 meters from the present 30 meters.

Airlines and destinations

References

Airports in Central Sulawesi